Aspirin causes several different effects in the body, mainly the reduction of inflammation, analgesia (relief of pain), the prevention of clotting, and the reduction of fever.  Much of this is believed to be due to decreased production of prostaglandins and TXA2. Aspirin's ability to suppress the production of prostaglandins and thromboxanes is due to its irreversible inactivation of the cyclooxygenase (COX) enzyme. Cyclooxygenase is required for prostaglandin and thromboxane synthesis. Aspirin acts as an acetylating agent where an acetyl group is covalently attached to a serine residue in the active site of the COX enzyme. This makes aspirin different from other NSAIDs (such as diclofenac and ibuprofen), which are reversible inhibitors.  However, other effects of aspirin, such as uncoupling oxidative phosphorylation in mitochondria, and the modulation of signaling through NF-κB, are also being investigated. Some of its effects are like those of salicylic acid, which is not an acetylating agent.

Effects on cyclooxygenase

There are at least two different cyclooxygenase isozymes: COX-1 (PTGS1) and COX-2 (PTGS2).  Aspirin is non-selective and irreversibly inhibits both forms (but is weakly more selective for COX-2). It does so by acetylating the hydroxyl of a serine residue. Normally COX produces prostaglandins, most of which are pro-inflammatory, and thromboxanes, which promote clotting. Aspirin-modified COX-2 produces lipoxins, most of which are anti-inflammatory. 

Newer NSAID drugs called COX-2 selective inhibitors have been developed that inhibit only COX-2, with the hope for reduction of gastrointestinal side-effects. However, several COX-2 selective inhibitors have subsequently been withdrawn after evidence emerged that COX-2 inhibitors increase the risk of heart attack (e.g., see the article on Vioxx). The underlying mechanism for the deleterious effect proposes that endothelial cells lining the microvasculature in the body express COX-2, whose selective inhibition results in levels of prostaglandin I2 (PGI2, prostacyclin) down-regulated relative to thromboxane (since COX-1 in platelets is unaffected). Thus, the protective anti-coagulative effect of PGI2 is decreased, increasing the risk of thrombus and associated heart attacks and other circulatory problems. As platelets have no DNA, they are unable to synthesize new COX once aspirin has irreversibly inhibited the enzyme, an important difference between aspirin and the reversible inhibitors.

Effects on prostaglandins and thromboxanes

Prostaglandins are local chemical messengers that exert multiple effects including but not limited to the transmission of pain information to the brain, modulation of the hypothalamic thermostat, and inflammation. They are produced in response to the stimulation of phospholipids within the plasma membrane of cells resulting in the release of arachidonic acid (prostaglandin precursor).
Thromboxanes are responsible for the aggregation of platelets that form blood clots.

Low-dose, long-term aspirin use irreversibly blocks the formation of thromboxane A2 in platelets, producing an inhibitory effect on platelet aggregation.

This antiplatelet property makes aspirin useful for reducing the incidence of heart attacks; heart attacks are primarily caused by blood clots, and their reduction with the introduction of small amounts of aspirin has been seen to be an effective medical intervention. A dose of 40 mg of aspirin a day is able to inhibit a large proportion of maximum thromboxane A2 release provoked acutely, with the prostaglandin I2 synthesis being little affected; however, higher doses of aspirin are required to attain further inhibition.

A side-effect of aspirin mechanism is that the ability of the blood in general to clot is reduced, and excessive bleeding may result from the use of aspirin.

Other methods of action
Aspirin has been shown to have three additional modes of action. It uncouples oxidative phosphorylation in cartilaginous (and hepatic) mitochondria, by diffusing from the intermembrane space as a proton carrier back into the mitochondrial matrix, where it ionizes once again to release protons. In short, aspirin buffers and transports the protons, acting as a competitor to ATP synthase. When high doses of aspirin are given, aspirin may actually cause hyperthermia due to the heat released from the electron transport chain, as opposed to the antipyretic action of aspirin seen with lower doses.

Additionally, aspirin induces the formation of NO-radicals in the body, which have been shown in mice to have an independent mechanism of reducing inflammation. This reduces leukocyte adhesion, which is an important step in immune response to infection. There is currently insufficient evidence to show that aspirin helps to fight infection.

More recent data also suggests that salicylic acid and its derivatives modulate signaling through NF-κB. NF-κB is a transcription factor complex that plays a central role in many biological processes, including inflammation.

Reye's syndrome

Reye's syndrome is a potentially fatal disease that causes numerous detrimental effects to many organs, especially the brain and liver, as well as causing hypoglycemia.  The exact cause is unknown, and while it has been associated with aspirin consumption by children with viral illness, it also occurs in the absence of aspirin use.

The disease causes fatty liver with minimal inflammation and severe encephalopathy (with swelling of the brain). The liver may become slightly enlarged and firm, and there is a change in the appearance of the kidneys. Jaundice is not usually present.

Early diagnosis is vital; while most children recover with supportive therapy, severe brain injury or death are potential complications.

See also
 History of aspirin

References

Medication pharmacology